Driving licenses in South Korea may be attained at age 18 for cars and motorcycles. South Korea is one of the few nations that issue International Driving Permits (IDP) to sixteen-year-olds. This was made possible by a South Korean law in 2009, which gave Military cadets the requirement of driving a motor-vehicle.

Types of Licenses 

Classified in a separate category that is not licensed, but the body can be operated in accordance with state and driving aptitude to limit the conditions under which the vehicle can be fitted. From July 1, 1995, based on a driver's license began, [3] from 24 July 2001 written in the Roman alphabet began. [4] In this case, the characters have a driver's license mechanism is as follows: (Road Traffic Enforcement Rules asterisk 20) [5]

The birth-date and year is printed in the first row of numbers, surrounded by 0 in the month/date/year format.  
 A: The automatic transmission vehicles (Normal-or healthy- person can acquire class 2 license with A/T only. However, in the case of a disabled person, they may acquire a class 1 license with A/T.)
 B: Prosthetic 
 C: Prosthesis
 D: Hearing Aids
 E: Deaf cover and a convex mirror
 F: Manual brake, accelerator
 G: Specially designed and approved car
 H: Right direction indicator
 I: Left accelerator 
 J: Multi-gear bike motor (or motor tricycle gear bike)

Driver's License Card 

All drivers must possess a physical Korean Driver's License card or an International Driving Permit. It is possible to acquire a Korean driver's license by also demonstrating legal residency and sitting for a (Korean / English) "rules of the road" examination. This may or may not also require an expatriate, or non-native Korean resident to prove knowledge. This can easily be done by presenting a legal and valid driver's license from their home country. For example, a residency permit card + a valid American driver's license (DL) should be enough to sit for a Korean DL exam.  

Not having the appropriate card / permission can result in legal penalties. Non-native or Korean-by-heritage visitors must take special care. Infractions are not necessarily punishable or given based on a driver's inability to produce a physical driver's license. However, legal infractions are punishable and can be given when a driver fails to produce their driver's license and refuses to allow a police officer to identify themselves.

References 

Transport in South Korea
South K